is a feminine Japanese given name. It is often written with the single kanji 瞳 (Japanese for eye) or the two kanji 仁美. It can also come from 智 (hito) meaning "wisdom, intellect" and 美 (mi) meaning "beautiful". Individuals may alternatively write the name using the hiragana as ひとみ. The singer hitomi writes her stage name using the Latin alphabet.

Possible writings 
仁美, "benevolent, humane, noble, beauty"
人美, "someone, person, beauty"
一美, "one, beauty"
均美, "level beauty"
等美, "class, equal, beauty"
傭美, "employ, hire, beauty"

People

Singers
Hitomi Furuya (古谷仁美, born 1976), a Japanese singer-songwriter
Hitomi Kuroishi (黒石ひとみ), a Japanese singer, author, and composer noted for her involvement with the soundtracks of the anime Last Exile and Code Geass
Hitomi Shimatani (島谷ひとみ, born 1980), a Japanese female pop singer whose songs include one of Inuyasha'''s opening theme song "Angelus"
, Japanese singer
Hitomi Yaida (矢井田 瞳 born 1978),  Japanese pop/folk rock singer-songwriter, guitarist, and musician
Hitomi Yoshizawa (吉澤 ひとみ, born 1985), Japanese pop singer and former leader of the J-pop group Morning Musume
Hitomi Isaka (井坂 仁美 ), member of the group Kamen Rider Girls
Hitomi Honda (本田仁美, born 2001), Japanese singer and member of AKB48 and Iz*One

Voice actresses/actresses
Hitomi (ひと美, born 1967), Japanese voice actress from Osaka
Hitomi Aizawa (相澤 仁美), Japanese actress, gravure idol and race queen
Hitomi Kobayashi (小林ひとみ, born 1965), important early Japanese AV idol
Hitomi Kuroki (黒木瞳, born 1960), Japanese actress who voiced Helen Parr/Elastigirl/Mrs. Incredible in the Japanese dub of The IncrediblesHitomi Nabatame (生天目 仁美, born 1976), Japanese voice actress, whose roles include Nanao Ise from Bleach, Japanese actress
Hitomi Shiraishi (白石ひとみ, born 1971), Japanese AV Idol from the 1990s
, Japanese actress
Hitomi Yoshida (born 1984) Japanese voice actress

 Other 
, Japanese swimmer
Hitomi Kamanaka (鎌仲ひとみ, born 1958), Japanese documentary filmmaker
Hitomi Kanehara (金原 ひとみ, born 1983), writer who wrote Hebi ni Piasu (Snakes and Earrings)
Hitomi Kashima (鹿島 瞳, born 1980), former Japanese butterfly swimmer
, Japanese handball player
, Japanese table tennis player
, Japanese musician and composer
, Japanese hurdler
Hitomi Soga (曽我ひとみ, born 1959), Japanese woman who was abducted to North Korea to train agents in Japanese customs and language
Hitomi Takagaki (高垣 眸, 1898–1983), Japanese writer
, Japanese photographer
Hitomi Yamaguchi, author and contributor to NakayoshiKinue Hitomi (人見 絹枝, 1907–1931), Japanese athlete and the first Japanese woman to receive an Olympic medal

 Characters 
Hitomi Kagewaki, the young castle lord from InuYashaHitomi Kanzaki, heroine of The Vision of EscaflowneHitomi Kisugi, one of the Cat's Eye trio
Hitomi, a character from the Dead or Alive series
Hitomi, a character in the Lego theme Exo-ForceHitomi Shinonome, a character in Loveless (manga)Hitomi, a major antagonist in Code:BreakerHitomi Shizuki, a minor character in Puella Magi Madoka MagicaHitomi Manaka, main protagonist of the manga Nurse Hitomi's Monster InfirmaryHitomi, friend of Yuri in Wedding Peach
Hitomi Tadano, a character in Komi Can't Communicate
Hitomi Takano, main protagonist of the manga Hitomi-chan is Shy With Strangers''

See also 
Hitomi (disambiguation)
Hitomi Takahashi (disambiguation)

References

Japanese feminine given names